The 2007 American Le Mans Series season was the 37th season for the IMSA GT Championship, with the ninth labeled as the American Le Mans Series.  It was a series for Le Mans Prototypes (LMP) and Grand Touring (GT) race cars divided into 4 classes: LMP1, LMP2, GT1, and GT2.  It began March 17, 2007, and ended October 20, 2007 after 12 races. It was the league's longest season since 2000.

Schedule
Following the ten race schedule of 2006, a twelve race schedule was announced for 2007.  While the Portland International Raceway was not part of the new schedule, three new temporary street circuits were added.  The streets of St. Petersburg and the Long Beach circuit were added after the 12 Hours of Sebring, while the new Belle Isle circuit was added before Petit Le Mans.

Fuel supplier

Ethanol
Announced on February 8, 2007, the American Le Mans Series signed an agreement with the Ethanol Promotion and Information Council (EPIC) to run E10 ethanol-enriched fuel in all gasoline-powered entries.  The fuel was 10% ethanol and 90% gasoline.  EPIC also sponsored Rahal Letterman Racing's Porsche entry as part of the deal.  This was similar to Rahal Letterman's deal in the Indy Racing League. From 2007 season onwards, VP Racing Fuels replaced Sunoco as official gasoline supplier for American Le Mans Series.

Season results

Overall winner in bold.

Teams championship

For most races, points are awarded to the top 10 finishers in the following order:
 20-16-13-10-8-6-4-3-2-1
For the four-hour Road America 500 and Monterey Sports Car Championships are scored in the following order:
 23-19-16-13-11-9-7-6-5-4
And for the 12 Hours of Sebring and Petit Le Mans which award the top 10 finishers in the following order:
 26-22-19-16-14-12-10-9-8-7

Cars failing to complete 70% of the winner's distance are not awarded points.  Teams only score the points of their highest finishing entry in each race.

LMP1 standings

LMP2 standings

GT1 standings

GT2 standings

Drivers championship
For most races, points are awarded to the top 10 finishers in the following order:
 20-16-13-10-8-6-4-3-2-1
For the four hour Road America 500 and Monterey Sports Car Championships are scored in the following order:
 23-19-16-13-11-9-7-6-5-4
And for the 12 Hours of Sebring and Petit Le Mans which award the top 10 finishers in the following order:
 26-22-19-16-14-12-10-9-8-7

Cars failing to complete 70% of the winner's distance are not awarded points.  Drivers failing to drive for at least 45 minutes in the race are not awarded points, with the exception of the Long Beach round where drivers need only 30 minutes minimum.

LMP1 standings

LMP2 standings

GT1 standings

GT2 standings

External links
 American Le Mans Series homepage
 American Le Mans Series schedule
 Mariantic ALMS 2007 news
 SpeedArena ALMS news

American Le Mans Series seasons
 
Le Mans
American Le Mans